During World War II, Operation Span was an Allied military deception operation in support of the landings in southern France in 1944. 

After the Dragoon landings, landing craft and other amphibious vessels were used to approach likely landing areas elsewhere in southern France coast and along the Italian coast. This tied down German troops and prevented their deployment against the beachhead.

References 

Battles and operations of World War II
Operation Dragoon
World War II deception operations